The 1948 Western Kentucky Hilltoppers football team represented Western Kentucky State College (now known as Western Kentucky University) as a member of the Ohio Valley Conference (OVC) during the 1948 college football season. Led by first-year head coach Jack Clayton, the Hilltoppers compiled an overall record of 5–4 with a mark of 2–3 in conference play, placing fifth in the OVC.

Schedule

References

Western Kentucky
Western Kentucky Hilltoppers football seasons
Western Kentucky Hilltoppers football